Charles Edward Munnings (6 July 1906 – March 1995) was an English professional footballer who played in the Football League for Hull City, Mansfield Town and Swindon Town.

References

1906 births
1995 deaths
English footballers
Association football forwards
English Football League players
Boston Town F.C. (1920s) players
Grimsby Town F.C. players
Swindon Town F.C. players
Hull City A.F.C. players
Mansfield Town F.C. players
Boston United F.C. players